Sebina is a village located in the Central District of Botswana. It had 3,276 inhabitants at the 2011 census.

See also
 List of cities in Botswana
 Mathangwane Village

References

Populated places in Botswana